The 2020–21 Campeonato de Portugal is the eighth season of Portuguese football's renovated third-tier league, since the merging of the Segunda Divisão and Terceira Divisão in 2013, and the sixth season under the current Campeonato de Portugal title. A total of 96 teams compete in this division.

Due to the cancellation of all non-professional competitions in the country due to the COVID-19 pandemic in Portugal in the previous season, no teams were relegated, which lead to an additional team from each of the 20 district championships. The Portuguese Football Federation decided on the creation of Liga 3, a new tier in the Portuguese league system beginning with the 2021–22 season, as well as a new format for the Campeonato de Portugal, including the addition of four reserve teams invited from Primeira Liga clubs, raising the total number of teams from 72 to 96. This new format will reduce the total number of teams to 56 in the next season.>

Format
The new competition format consists of three stages. In the first stage, the 96 clubs were divided in eight series of 12 teams, according to geographic criteria, with a maximum of two reserve teams in each series. In each series, teams play against each other in a home-and-away double round-robin system.

First stage
The first stage schedule was drawn on 4 September 2020 and are played from 20 September 2020 to 3 April 2021.

Serie A

Results

Serie B

Results

Serie C

Results

Serie D

Results

Serie E

Results

Serie F

Results

Serie G

Results

Serie H

Results

References

Campeonato Nacional de Seniores seasons
3
Por